The Desert Horseman is a 1946 American Western film directed by Ray Nazarro and written by Sherman L. Lowe. The film stars Charles Starrett, Adele Roberts, Walt Shrum and Smiley Burnette. The film was released on July 11, 1946, by Columbia Pictures.

Plot

Cast           
Charles Starrett as Steve Godfrey / The Durango Kid
Adele Roberts as Mary Ann Jarvis 
Walt Shrum as Bass Player
Smiley Burnette as Smiley Burnette
Richard Bailey as Sam Treadway
John Merton as Rex Young
George Morgan as Pete
Tommy Coats as Baldy
Jack Kirk as Sheriff
Bud Osborne as Walt
Riley Hill as Eddie

References

External links
 

1946 films
1950s English-language films
American Western (genre) films
1946 Western (genre) films
Columbia Pictures films
Films directed by Ray Nazarro
American black-and-white films
1940s American films